Curt Massey (May 3, 1910 – October 21, 1991) was a musician in the old-time radio era.

Early years
Massey was born in Midland, Texas. He came from a musical family, the best known of whom was probably Louise Massey, a country and western singer. Their father was Henry Massey. As a youngster, he studied violin, trumpet, cornet, and piano. He went on to study music at the Horner Conservatory of Music in Kansas City.

Curt played violin for the family's musical group, Louise Massey and the Westerners.

Radio
Massey had two self-titled music-variety programs. Curt Massey Time was on CBS beginning in 1943; The Curt Massey Show was on ABC beginning in 1949. The latter co-starred Martha Tilton and was sometimes billed as The Curt Massey and Martha Tilton Show or as Alka-Seltzer Time.

Other programs on which Massey was featured included Nash-Kelvinator's Musical Hits, Sheaffer World Parade, Romance in Rhythm, Twilight Trail, The Friday Night Show, The Andrews Sisters Program, Avalon Time, KMBC Brush Creek Follies, Holiday for Music, Plantation Jubilee, and Plantation Party. On January 2, 1956, Massey debuted on KNX radio in Los Angeles with a 25-minute weeknight program. It lasted three months.

In some cases, Massey arranged music for programs in addition to singing and playing instruments.

Television
In October 1956, Massey began a Monday-Thursday program on KRCA-TV in Los Angeles, California. The 6:15 p.m. (Pacific Time) program also featured Martha Tilton and Country Washburn and was broadcast in color at least during Summer 1959. Massey also wrote and sang the theme song for the television series Petticoat Junction.

Recognition
In 1961, Massey received an Emmy Award "for his career in radio and television."

Personal life
Massey and his wife, Edythe, had two sons, Stephen and David.

Death
Massey died October 21, 1991, at Eisenhower Medical Center in Rancho Mirage, California. He was 81.

Filmography

Film
{| class="wikitable sortable"
|-
! Year
! Title
! Role
! class="unsortable" | Notes
|-
| 1936
| The Hills of Old Wyomin'''
| Himself as a Westerners Band Member
| Short film directed by Dave Fleischer.
|-
| 1937
| Twilight on the Trail| Himself as a Member of The Westerners Band
| 
|-
| rowspan="2" | 1938
|Love Goes West| Himself as a Member of The Westerners Band 
| 
|-
| Where the Buffalo Roam| Fiddle Player
| 
|-
|}

Television

Screenplay credits

Television composer credits

Soundtrack credits
{| class="wikitable sortable"
|-
! Year
! Title
! Role
! class="unsortable" | Notes
|-
| 1936
| The Hills of Old Wyomin'| 
| Member of The Westerners Band
|-
| 1937
| Twilight on the Trail| 
| Member of The Westerners Band
|-
| 1944
| Swing in the Saddle| rowspan="2" | Writer
| 
|-
| 1948
| The Strawberry Roan| The Angel Song (When the Angels turn the lights on in Heaven)|-
|}

Partial discographyIf I Had My Way (Columbia 1945)You've Got Me Where You Want Me (Columbia 1945)Sweetheart of My Dreams (Columbia 1945)Candy (Columbia 1945)Five Minutes More'' (Cadet 1946)

References

External links 
 
 Streaming episodes of Alka-Seltzer Time with Curt Massey and Martha Tilton, from The Internet Archive

1991 deaths
1910 births
American male violinists
American television composers
People from Midland, Texas
Singers from Texas
20th-century American singers
American radio bandleaders
20th-century American composers
20th-century American violinists
20th-century American male musicians